FC Viktoriya Nazarovo was a Russian football team from Nazarovo.

External links
  Team history at KLISF

Association football clubs established in 1994
Association football clubs disestablished in 1999
Defunct football clubs in Russia
Sport in Krasnoyarsk Krai
1994 establishments in Russia
1999 disestablishments in Russia